Topgolf is a golf driving range game with electronically tracked golfballs and automatically scored drives that started in 2000 and grew to become a multinational sports entertainment company. Headquartered in Dallas, Texas, it has locations in the United States, United Kingdom, Australia, Germany, Mexico and the United Arab Emirates. In October 2020, publicly traded Callaway Golf announced it was acquiring Topgolf, with the merger completed in March 2021. TopGolf locations in Australia are run by a joint venture of Topgolf International (3.7%) and Village Roadshow Theme Parks. In Canada, a joint venture with Cineplex Entertainment was established to operate locations there, but was abandoned by Cineplex in 2020.

History 

Twin brothers Steve and Dave Jolliffe had sold their mystery shopping business and were looking for a new project in 1997. Both golfers, they began complaining about golf's issues: the time factor and lackluster driving ranges. Looking to improve the game, the Jolliffes looked to the then-new commercial microchip technology and placed it in the golf ball. From this, they designed a new game, Topgolf, which is a redesigned driving range. In Watford, just outside London, the twins built the first location, which opened in 2000. The golfing community and businesses were not enthusiastic about the game. The PGA and golf equipment companies refused to get involved.

In 2003, bankers approached Richard Grogan to invest but were rejected. Grogan later had been induced to visit the Topgolf facility in February 2004. Seeing only a 5% return on investment, Grogan turned them down again, although he was otherwise impressed during the visit. Grogan with three other partners—David Main, Eric Wilkinson, Tom Mendell—then struck upon how to increase business by making it an experience by having an event space, larger kitchens, and restaurants, making locations 3 to 4 times the original's size. Grogan, Main, Wilkinson, Mendell founded and started up the US licensee, Topgolf International, and found investors. WestRiver Group was a lead investor.

Alexandria, Virginia was selected due to its close proximity to Washington, D.C., which could attract government officials from golf courses. This location opened in 2005. This location struggled so Grogan decided, although it is in a colder climate, to open a location in Chicago. Snow closed the location for its first four weeks and caused equipment damage. The next Topgolf location, Dallas, was selected for its connection to golf, a warmer environment, and Fortune 500 companies. With little traffic at any location, Grogan expect to be closed by May 2007. With an energetic Dallas staff in February 2007, Grogan and Main brainstormed a number of low-tech marketing techniques to draw customers as they needed to explain Topgolf like in the UK. After six months, the Dallas facility had a six-hour wait.

In 2009, Topgolf International (US) acquired Topgolf UK then in July from World Golf Systems the TopGolf intellectual property aspects. By 2011, WestRiver's head Erik Anderson took over the executive chairman post from Grogan. Anderson moved to have newer location be even larger, with a full line kitchen and executive chefs replacing small kitchens and more golfer space. Ten locations were opened in 2013. Topgolf had sales of $163.5 million in 2014 to make the Inc. 500. Mobile phone apps were issued in 2013, with social media digital walls added to locations in 2015.

By 2015, Topgolf had 28 locations that brought in 8 million customers. In January 2016, the company purchased the World Golf Tour gaming company. Also that year, Protracer golf ball tracking technology was purchased and renamed Toptracer.

Topgolf and Village Roadshow Theme Parks agreed in 2016 to a joint venture to bring Topgolf to Australia. Village Roadshow received a 67% stake in the joint venture by providing 100% of the startup funds. On June 23, 2016, it was announced that Village Roadshow would open a venue next door to its popular theme parks, Warner Bros. Movie World in Oxenford, Queensland in Australia. This was the first Topgolf venue outside the US and the UK The location opened in June 2018. Village indicated in March 2018 that they were looking for location proposals for up to eight Australia and Asia/Pacific locations. In July 2018, Village Roadshow sold $50 million in shares to fund Topgolf and for other purposes. In August 2018, Topgolf Australia reduced its stake in the joint venture from 33% to 3.7% with options to boost its share back up to 33% before December 31, 2020. Despite this action, Village Roadshow CEO Clark Kirby said the company continues to actively pursue other locations after encouraging financial results from Topgolf Australia.

In 2017, Topgolf created a new television series titled Who Will Rock You, where eight of the best unsigned bands across the country compete for $50,000 and a Topgolf tour. Season one premiered in May 2018 won by Crimson Riot! female-led rock group. A second season with Matador Content and music publisher BMG was agreed upon with a March 28, 2019 start with 12 unsigned bands and a prize of $50,000 and signing with BMG. Topgolf Studios had four series available on its YouTube channel by October 2, 2019. At that time, the unit agreed with Will Smith's Westbrook Media to produce additional series with the unit for Topgolf starting with This Joka comedian documentary series.

Canadian movie theatre company Cineplex Entertainment announced it entered a joint venture with Topgolf in July 2017 to open several Topgolf entertainment locations across Canada. However, in 2020, Topgolf and Cineplex mutually agreed to cancel the agreement due to financial pressure on Cineplex as a result of the COVID-19 pandemic.

Topgolf gave the Seattle area a preview of the venue with its first Crush event at  T-Mobile Park in February 2017. On April 9, 2019, the company announced the first location for a new smaller version of its venue, Topgolf Lounge, in Kirkland, Washington and it opened in January 2020. On August 3, 2021, Topgolf broke ground on a new venue in Renton.

In September of 2021, the U.S. Department of Labor forced Topgolf to pay 255 employees in 25 states, over $750,000 in back wages for unpaid overtime. Investigators said the company was paying sales managers and event sales consultants a salary plus commission, with no overtime after a 40 hour work week. They said those employees did not meet supervisory requirements, and were eligible for overtime pay. They added that the investigation was opened after the violations were found at the company’s Loudoun County, Virginia location.

The Department of Labor said the company’s policy violated the Fair Labor Standards Act.

Merger with Callaway 
On October 27, 2020, Callaway Golf Company announced it would acquire Topgolf for $2 billion. At the time, Callaway held a 14% share of Topgolf. Callaway had invested in Topgolf since 2006, with CEO Chip Brewer serving on the Topgolf board since 2012.

Games
There are multiple Topgolf game variations, the micro chipped golf balls score themselves, providing players with instant feedback on each shot's accuracy and distance.

Top Golf – Players aim for 11 giant dartboard-like targets. The further the shot goes and the closer to the pin, the more points the player receives.
Top Break – has a snooker based format in which a player must hit a red target then a coloured target. The higher value colours, the more points are awarded.
Top Chip – Use just the red target (5 shots), yellow target (5 shots) and green target (10 shots). Hit the correct target to earn points, but hit the wrong one and points are deducted.
Top Shot – Similar to TopChip. You have to hit targets at four consecutive distances (5 shots each) Whichever starting target you choose (red, yellow, green or brown) determines the games level of difficulty
Top Pressure – An accuracy game, in which you need to hit all nine sections within the yellow target. Move on to the second and third level to see the value of points multiply, hit the same section twice on level 2 and 3 and points will be deducted.

Locations 

There are currently 70+ Topgolf locations, three in the United Kingdom, and one in Australia, Germany, Mexico, the UAE and Thailand.  Each Topgolf venue features climate-controlled hitting bays for year-round play, food, beverage, music and HDTVs on which various sports games are shown, such as football, basketball and golf. Topgolf also offers golf lessons, leagues, tournaments, concerts, and corporate and social events.

TopGolf Lounge, or Lounge by Topgolf, is a smaller location with a live sports restaurant, a few public hitting bays and a special events bay plus virtual game simulators. The first opened on January 17, 2020 in Kirkland Urban second floor, Kirkland, Washington.

References

External links
 

Forms of golf
Sports entertainment
Entertainment companies established in 2000
2000 establishments in the United Kingdom
American companies established in 2000
Companies based in Dallas
2021 mergers and acquisitions